Manuel Alcaraz Tapia (born March 14, 1981) is an American professional mixed martial arts fighter currently competing in the Bantamweight division. He has formerly competed for the WEC, King of the Cage, and Tachi Palace Fights. He is the former King of the Cage Flyweight Champion.

Background
Tapia is from Riverside, California. After the death of his parents, Tapia used football, judo, and wrestling as outlets for his anger. He attended Don Lugo High School in Chino, California and Chaffey College. Tapia was originally introduced to mixed martial arts a year out of high school.

Mixed martial arts career

Early career
Tapia made his professional mixed martial arts debut in 2003 for King of the Cage and compiled a record of 4-0-1 before winning the King of the Cage Flyweight Championship. He later signed with the WEC and was stripped of his title.

World Extreme Cagefighting
Tapia made his WEC debut at WEC 27 on May 12, 2007 in a Featherweight bout against Brandon Foxworth and won via TKO in the second round.

Tapia then fought at WEC 32 on February 13, 2008 against Antonio Banuelos and won via split decision. This brought Tapia's career record to 10-0-1.

At WEC 37, Tapia suffered a second-round TKO loss in a title fight with the WEC Bantamweight Champion Miguel Torres and lost via unanimous decision to Akitoshi Tamura at WEC 40. Tapia then fought Eddie Wineland on October 10, 2009 on the undercard at WEC 43, losing via unanimous decision.

Tapia was then released from the WEC after this loss and it was announced on November 17, 2009 that he has signed with Tachi Palace Fights. He debuted on their February 4 event in Lemoore, California, facing current UFC fighter Michael McDonald and lost via TKO in the first round.

Personal life
Aside from fighting, Tapia currently works in Law Enforcement.

Championships and accomplishments
King of the Cage
KOTC Flyweight Championship (One time)

Mixed martial arts record

|-
| Win
| align=center| 12–4–1
| Pete Sabala
| Decision (unanimous)
| SCMMA 1 - Inland Empire Strikes
| 
| align=center| 3
| align=center| 5:00
| Ontario, California, United States
| 
|-
| Win
| align=center| 11–4–1
| Bobby Sanchez
| Decision (unanimous)
| Respect in the Cage 10
| 
| align=center| 3
| align=center| 5:00
| Pomona, California, United States
| 
|-
| Loss
| align=center| 10–4–1
| Michael McDonald
| TKO (punches)
| TPF 3: Champions Collide
| 
| align=center| 1
| align=center| 4:31
| Lemoore, California, United States
| 
|-
| Loss
| align=center| 10–3–1
| Eddie Wineland
| Decision (unanimous)
| WEC 43
| 
| align=center| 3
| align=center| 5:00
| San Antonio, Texas, United States
| 
|-
| Loss
| align=center| 10–2–1
| Akitoshi Tamura
| Decision (unanimous)
| WEC 40
| 
| align=center| 3
| align=center| 5:00
| Chicago, Illinois, United States
| 
|-
| Loss
| align=center| 10–1–1
| Miguel Torres
| TKO (punches and elbows)
| WEC 37: Torres vs. Tapia
| 
| align=center| 2
| align=center| 3:02
| Las Vegas, Nevada, United States
| 
|-
| Win
| align=center| 10–0–1
| Antonio Banuelos
| Decision (split)
| WEC 32: Condit vs. Prater
| 
| align=center| 3
| align=center| 5:00
| Rio Rancho, New Mexico, United States
| 
|-
| Win
| align=center| 9–0–1
| Brandon Foxworth
| TKO (punches)
| WEC 27
| 
| align=center| 2
| align=center| 3:17
| Las Vegas, Nevada, United States
| Featherweight bout.
|-
| Win
| align=center| 8–0–1
| Richard Montano
| TKO (knee & punches)
| KOTC: Destroyer
| 
| align=center| 3
| align=center| 3:24
| San Jacinto, California, United States
| 
|-
| Win
| align=center| 7–0–1
| Shad Smith
| Decision (unanimous)
| KOTC: Rapid Fire
| 
| align=center| 3
| align=center| 5:00
| San Jacinto, California, United States
| 
|-
| Win
| align=center| 6–0–1
| Ed Newalu
| Decision (unanimous)
| KOTC 63: Final Conflict
| 
| align=center| 3
| align=center| 5:00
| San Jacinto, California, United States
| 
|-
| Win
| align=center| 5–0–1
| Gregory Vivian
| Submission (arm-triangle choke)
| KOTC 58: Prime Time
| 
| align=center| 1
| align=center| 4:25
| San Jacinto, California, United States
| 
|-
| Win
| align=center| 4–0–1
| Richard Goodman
| TKO (punches)
| KOTC: Mortal Sins
| 
| align=center| 2
| align=center| 2:07
| Primm, Nevada, United States
| 
|-
| Win
| align=center| 3–0–1
| Ed Newalu
| Decision (unanimous)
| KOTC 41: Relentless
| 
| align=center| 3
| align=center| 5:00
| San Jacinto, California, United States
| 
|-
| Win
| align=center| 2–0–1
| Michael Welty
| KO (punch)
| KOTC 37: Unfinished Business
| 
| align=center| 1
| align=center| 0:07
| San Jacinto, California, United States
| 
|-
| Draw
| align=center| 1–0–1
| Chad Washburn
| Draw (split)
| KOTC 33: After Shock
| 
| align=center| 3
| align=center| 5:00
| San Jacinto, California, United States
| 
|-
| Win
| align=center| 1–0
| Manuel Sawyze
| Submission (rear-naked choke)
| KOTC 31: King of the Cage 31
| 
| align=center| 1
| align=center| 2:07
| San Jacinto, California, United States
|

References

External links

Living people
1981 births
American male mixed martial artists
American mixed martial artists of Mexican descent
Bantamweight mixed martial artists
Featherweight mixed martial artists
Flyweight mixed martial artists
Mixed martial artists utilizing wrestling
Mixed martial artists utilizing judo
Mixed martial artists utilizing Brazilian jiu-jitsu
Sportspeople from Riverside, California
Mixed martial artists from California
American male judoka
American practitioners of Brazilian jiu-jitsu
People awarded a black belt in Brazilian jiu-jitsu